The Yamaha DX7 is a synthesizer manufactured by the Yamaha Corporation from 1983 to 1989. It was the first successful digital synthesizer and is one of the best-selling synthesizers in history, selling more than 200,000 units.

In the early 1980s, the synthesizer market was dominated by analog synthesizers. FM synthesis, a means of generating sounds via frequency modulation, was developed by John Chowning at Stanford University, California. FM synthesis created brighter, "glassier" sounds, and could better imitate acoustic sounds such as brass. Yamaha licensed the technology to create the DX7, combining it with very-large-scale integration chips to lower manufacturing costs.

With its complex menus and lack of conventional controls, few learned to program the DX7 in depth. However, its preset sounds became staples of 1980s pop music, used by artists including A-ha, Kenny Loggins, Kool & the Gang, Whitney Houston, Chicago, Phil Collins, Luther Vandross, and Billy Ocean. Its electric piano sound was particularly widely used, especially in power ballads. The English producer Brian Eno was proficient at programming his own sounds, and it was instrumental to his work in ambient music.

The DX7 was succeeded by FM synthesizers including the DX1, DX21, DX27 and DX100.

Development 
By the mid-20th century, frequency modulation (FM), a means of carrying sound, had been understood for decades and was widely used to broadcast radio transmissions. In the 1960s, at Stanford University, California, John Chowning developed FM synthesis, a means of using FM to generate sounds different from analog synthesis. In 1971, to demonstrate its commercial potential, Chowning used FM to emulate acoustic sounds such as organs and brass. Stanford patented the technology and hoped to license it, but was turned down by American companies including Hammond and Wurlitzer. Chowning felt their engineers, who were used to analog synthesis, did not understand FM.

At the time, the Japanese company Yamaha was the world's largest manufacturer of musical instruments but had little market share in the United States. One of their chief engineers visited Stanford and, according to Chowning, "in ten minutes he understood ... I guess Yamaha had already been working in the digital domain, so he knew exactly what I was saying." Yamaha licensed the technology for one year to determine its commercial viability, and in 1973 its organ division began developing a prototype FM monophonic synthesizer. In 1975, Yamaha negotiated exclusive rights for the technology.   

The Roland founder Ikutaro Kakehashi was also interested in the technology, but met Chowning six months after Yamaha had agreed to the deal. Kakehashi later said Yamaha were the natural partners in the venture, as they had the resources to make FM synthesis commercially viable.  Yamaha created the first hardware implementation of FM synthesis. The first commercial FM synthesizer was the Yamaha GS1, released in 1980, which was expensive to manufacture due to its integrated circuit chips. At the same time, Yamaha was developing the means to manufacture very-large-scale integration chips. These allowed the DX7 to use only two chips, compared to the GS1's 50. Yamaha also altered the implementation of the FM algorithms in the DX7 for efficiency and speed, producing a sampling rate higher than Stanford's synthesizers. Chowning felt this produced a noticeable "brilliant" sound.

Yamaha displayed a prototype of the DX7 in 1982, branded the CSDX in reference to the Yamaha CS range of analog synthesizers. In late 1982, Briton Dave Bristow and American Gary Leuenberger, experts on the Yamaha CS-80, flew to Japan to develop the DX7's voices. They had less than four days to create the DX7's 128 preset patches.

Features 

Compared to the "warm" and "fuzzy" sounds of analog synthesizers, the digital DX7 sounds "harsh", "glassy" and "chilly", with a richer, brighter sound. Its preset sounds constitute "struck" and "plucked" sounds with complex transients. Its keyboard spans five octaves, with sixteen-note polyphony, meaning sixteen notes can sound simultaneously. It has 32 sound-generating algorithms, each a different arrangement of its six sine wave operators. The keyboard expression allows for velocity sensitivity and aftertouch. The DX7 was the first synthesizer with a liquid-crystal display, and the first to allow users to name patches.

Sales 
The DX7 was the first commercially successful digital synthesizer and remains one of the bestselling synthesizers in history. According to Bristow, Yamaha had hoped the DX7 would sell more than 20,000 units; within a year, orders exceeded 150,000, and it had sold 200,000 units after three years. It was the first synthesizer to sell more than 100,000 units. Yamaha manufactured units on a scale American competitors could not match; by comparison, Moog sold 12,000 Minimoog synthesizers in 11 years, and could not meet demand. The FM patent was for years one of Stanford's highest earning. Chowning received royalties for all of Yamaha's FM synthesizers.

According to Dave Smith, founder of the synthesizer company Sequential, "The synthesizer market was tiny in the late 70s. No one was selling 50,000 of these things. It wasn't until the Yamaha DX7 came out that a company shipped 100,000-plus synths." Smith said the DX7 sold well as it was reasonably priced, had keyboard expression and 16 voices, and importantly was better at emulating acoustic sounds than competing products. Chowning credited the success to the combination of his FM patent with Yamaha's chip technology.

Impact 
At the time of release, the DX7 was the first digital synthesizer most musicians had used. It was very different from the analog synthesizers that had dominated the market; according to MusicRadar, its "spiky" and "crystalline" sounds made it "the perfect antidote to a decade of analog waveforms".

With complex submenus displayed on an LCD and no knobs and sliders to adjust the sound, many found the DX7 difficult to program. MusicRadar described its interface as "nearly impenetrable", with "operators, algorithms and unusual envelopes ... accessed through tedious menus and a diminutive display". Rather than create their own sounds, most users used the presets.

The presets were widely used in 1980s pop music. The "BASS 1" preset was used on songs such as "Take On Me" by A-ha, "Danger Zone" by Kenny Loggins, and "Fresh" by Kool & the Gang. The "E PIANO 1" preset became particularly famous, especially for power ballads, and was used by artists including Whitney Houston, Chicago, Phil Collins, Luther Vandross, Billy Ocean and Celine Dion. In 1986, it was used in 40% of the number-one singles on the US Billboard Hot 100, 40% of country number ones, and 60% of RnB number ones. The preset imitates a Rhodes piano, prompting some to abandon the Rhodes in favor of the DX7.

A few musicians skilled at programming the DX7 found employment creating sounds for other acts. Brian Eno learned to program the DX7 in depth and used it to create ambient music on his 1983 album Apollo: Atmospheres and Soundtracks. He shared instructions for recreating his patches in a 1987 issue of Keyboard. As a producer, Eno used the DX7 on records by U2 and Coldplay. In later years, the DX sounds came to be seen as dated or clichéd, and interest in FM synthesis declined, with second-hand digital synthesizers selling for less than analog. The development of software synthesizers such as Native Instruments FM8 led to a resurgence in the popularity of FM synthesis.

Successors  
According to Sound on Sound, throughout the mid-1980s, "Yamaha flooded the market with a plethora of low-cost FM synths." In 1987, it released the DX7II, though it did not match its predecessor's success. Further successors included the TX81Z, DX1, DX11, and DX21. Yamaha manufactured reduced versions of the DX sound chip, such as the YM2612, for use in technologies such as the Sega Genesis game console. In 2015, Yamaha released an updated, smaller FM synthesizer, the Reface DX.

See also
Yamaha DX1
DX21
DX27 
DX100

References

Further reading

External links

DX7
Polyphonic synthesizers
Digital synthesizers